The State Mufti is the most senior and most influential Sunni Muslim Ulema (religious and legal authority) in Brunei. The holder of the position is appointed by the Sultan of Brunei. The State Mufti is the head of the all Ulema in Brunei.

Role
The State Mufti is the most senior religious authority in the country. His main role is to give opinions (fatwas) on legal matters and on social affairs base on Islamic Koran, Hadeeth, Qiyas and Ijma' of Ulema.

History
The first State Mufti of Brunei was Ismail Omar Abdul Aziz from 1962 to 1965. He had been Mufti of Johore in Malaysia. In 1967, Ismail again became Brunei's State Mufti until his death. In 1994, Brunei-born Vice State Mufti Abdul Aziz Juned became the country's State Mufti.

State Mufti

References